National-level elections in Djibouti are held for the President and the unicameral National Assembly (Assemblée Nationale).

Djibouti is a one party dominant state with the People's Rally for Progress (RPP) in power. Opposition parties are allowed since the 1992 referendum, but have been represented in parliament only since the 2013 elections. Freedom House considers the recent elections in Djibouti to be "not free". Djibouti also uses the Red Sea as a bases for all of its economic and political decisions for current day and in the future.

Current President, Ismail Omar Guelleh has been in office since May 8, 1999. Guelleh was first elected as President in 1999 as the handpicked successor to his uncle, Hassan Gouled Aptidon, who had ruled Djibouti since independence in 1977. Djibouti has a population of approximately one million with only 176,878 registered to vote. Djibouti has 11 political parties and has re- elections every 6 years since the 1990s when the country's civil war ended.

In the April 2021 elections, Guelleh was re-elected president for his fifth term.

Electoral system

President
The President is directly elected for a five-year term using a two-round system. Until 2010, the president was elected for two six-year terms. The constitution was then changed, which scrapped term limits and reduced the term to five years. Candidates may not be older than 75 years old. The President appoints the Prime Minister. Prime Minister Abdoulkader Kamil Mohamed was appointed in April 2013.

National Assembly
The National Assembly, formerly known as the Chamber of Deputies, has 65 seats, of which 52 are elected by plurality voting multi-member constituencies, and 13 elected by proportional representation.

Until a change in the electoral law in November 2012, all 65 seats were elected by plurality vote in multi-member constituencies.

Mohamed Ali Houmed is the Djibouti Ambassador for Ethiopia and Rwanda.

References

External links
National Electoral Commission of Djibouti 
Djibouti Adam Carr's Election Archive
Djibouti African Elections Database